This is the list of Belgian ministers of energy.

List of ministers

Belgium
Energy